{|

{{Infobox ship career
|Hide header=
|Ship country=United States
|Ship flag=
|Ship name=USS Charles Mann
|Ship namesake=Previous name retained
|Ship owner=
|Ship operator=
|Ship registry=
|Ship route=
|Ship ordered=
|Ship awarded=
|Ship builder=
|Ship original cost=
|Ship yard number=
|Ship way number=
|Ship laid down=
|Ship launched=
|Ship sponsor=
|Ship christened=
|Ship completed=1903
|Ship acquired=6 or 7 June 1917 for use as a tug and section patrol vessel during World War I. She was commissioned as USS Charles Mann (SP-522) on 7 June 1917.

Assigned to the 1st Naval District, Charles Mann carried out patrol duty and conducted towing operations in the Boston, Massachusetts, area for the rest of World War I and into 1919.

Charles Mann was decommissioned on 29 November 1919 and sold on 27 February 1920.

Notes

References

Department of the Navy Naval History and Heritage Command Online Library of Selected Images: U.S. Navy Ships: USS Charles Mann (SP-522), 1917-1920
NavSource Online: Section Patrol Craft Photo Archive: Charles Mann (SP 522)

Auxiliary ships of the United States Navy
World War I auxiliary ships of the United States
Patrol vessels of the United States Navy
World War I patrol vessels of the United States
Ships built in Portland, Maine
1903 ships